Meir Kohn Bistritz (1820 – 7 September 1892) was an Austro-Hungarian Hebrew poet and author. He lived the greater part of his life in Vienna, where he published most of his works.

Work
The first of Bistritz's works was his notes and German translation of Mordecai ben Meir Kalman's didactic poem, Tavnit ha-bayit ('The Shape of the House', 1858). In the following year he published Kol rinnah ('The Voice of Rejoicing'), a Hebrew poem with a German translation, both composed by him on the occasion of the dedication of the new synagogue in Budapest. In 1863 he produced a new and improved edition of the anonymous Arukh ha-kitzur ('Abridged Dictionary'). A year later he edited and published Tziyun le-zikhron olam ('Sign of Eternal Remembrance'), a work in honour of the seventieth birthday of Isaac Noah Mannheimer, containing addresses, songs, and essays in Hebrew and German. He wrote other minor poems, and a humorous essay on the proverb "Wenn die Chassidim reisen, regnet es" (Jüdisch-Deutsches oder Deutsch Jüdisches Sprichwort, Vienna, 1880).

Bistritz's last and largest work was the Bi'ur tit ha-yavan (The Cleaning up of the Mire; Presburg, 1888), a vindictive attack on 's radical criticism in He-Ḥalutz in explaining the Talmud. The book is full of diatribes against Schorr's personality, and is written in abusive and bombastic style. The work closes with sixteen epigrams aimed at another alleged follower of Schorr, Asher Simḥah Weissmann, author of Kedushat ha-Tanakh.

Publications

References
 

1820 births
1892 deaths
German-language poets
Hebrew-language poets
Hebrew-language writers
Jewish poets
Jews and Judaism in Vienna
People from Považská Bystrica